This page is a list of all players who have won the men's FIFA World Cup tournament since its inception in 1930.

Participating teams have to register squads for each edition of the World Cup, which consisted of 22 players until 1998, of 23 players from 2002 to 2018, and of 26 players in 2022. Since 1978, winners' medals are given to all members of the winning squads. Prior to that, only players who were on the pitch during the final matches (or the de facto final in 1950) received medals. FIFA decided in 2007 to retroactively award winners' medals to all members of the winning squads between 1930 and 1974.

World Cup winning players and managers are among a selected few who are officially allowed to touch the FIFA World Cup Trophy with bare hands, the group also including heads of state and FIFA officials.

Winning players 
A total of 471 players have been in the winning team in the World Cup. Brazil's Pelé is the only one to have won three times, while another 20 have won twice.
No player has won two World Cups both as captain. Italy's Giuseppe Meazza (1938), Brazil's Bellini (1958), Mauro (1962) and Cafu (2002), and Argentina's Daniel Passarella (1978) lifted the trophy once as captain, but were not captain for the other tournament they won. Argentina's Diego Maradona (1986, 1990) and Lionel Messi (2014, 2022), Brazil's Dunga (1994, 1998), and France's Hugo Lloris (2018, 2022) captained their sides in two final matches, but only won on one occasion, while West Germany's Karl-Heinz Rummenigge (1982, 1986) lost both finals as captain.
Brazil's Pelé and Vavá are the only two players to score in two finals for winning teams. West Germany's Paul Breitner (1974, 1982) and France's Zinedine Zidane (1998, 2006) and Kylian Mbappé (2018, 2022) also scored in two finals, but only won on their first occasions.
Cafu is the only player to appear in three finals: 1994, 1998 and 2002.
Luis Monti is the only player to play in two finals for different national teams. He appeared in the 1930 final for Argentina, who lost, and the 1934 final for Italy, who won. Attilio Demaría was also in Argentina's 1930 squad and Italy's 1934 squad, but appeared in neither final.
Brazil's Mário Zagallo, having triumphed in 1958 and 1962 as player, went on to win as the manager in 1970, becoming the first to win both as player and manager. West Germany's Franz Beckenbauer is the second, winning as both captain (1974) and manager (1990). Didier Deschamps is the third: he led France to victory in 1998 as captain, and then in 2018 as manager.
Germany's Miroslav Klose is the only player to have won four World Cup medals: 2002 (silver), 2006, 2010 (both bronze) and 2014 (gold).

In the below table, years in bold indicate that the player appeared in the respective final match where his team won, while years in italics indicate that the player was an unused squad member in the respective tournament. Until 1974 members of squads who had not played in the respective final matches were not eligible for winners' medals, but in 2007 FIFA retroactively awarded 122 of these medals to the players concerned or their families.

Notes

By year 
In the below table, players highlighted in bold appeared in the respective finals, while players highlighted in italics were unused squad members in the respective tournaments.

See also 
 List of FIFA World Cup finals
 List of players who have appeared in the most FIFA World Cups
 List of FIFA World Cup winning managers

References 

Squad lists

Player profiles

External links 
 FIFA World Cup™, FIFA.com
 World Cup Champions Squads 1930 - 2018, RSSSF.com

winning players
FIFA World Cup winning players
Association football player non-biographical articles
Lists of champion association football players
Lists of sports world champions